The 2014 Liga Indonesia First Division season is the last (19th) edition of Liga Indonesia First Division before the league merged with the Liga Nusantara on 2015 season. After removal of Badan Liga Sepakbola Amatir Indonesia (BLAI) First Division this season is managed by PSSI competition committee and further delegated to the PT. Liga Indonesia (LI).

PS Kwarta Deli Serdang is the last season champion.

The competition starts on 29 April 2014 and  finish by 28 September 2014.

Cilegon United became champion after beating Persibat Batang in the final.

Format
As with previous seasons, the competition system used in the First Division this season is a home tournament with a round robin format. League is divided into three groups stage and knock-out round. In the first stage of the club is divided into 12 groups, group winner and runner-up advances to second stage. While the second stage is divided into four groups of six, the winner and runner-up of each group advances to third stage. In the third round the eight teams that qualify from the second round were divided into two groups of four, while the knockout consist of semi-finals and finals as well as the third place playoff. The champions and runner-up will promotion to 2015 Premier Division season

For regulatory and competition manual, still waiting for the discussion to be carried out when the managers meeting on 12 April 2014. Implementation of the 2014 First Division competition will be divided in five innings; the first round, second round, third round, fourth round, and Final. The timing of the competition will spend about five months since the end of April to September.

Both teams were finalists or champions and runners-up First Division competition will get a promotion to the Premier Division for the 2015 season. While the club was ranked three, four, five and six, or who are appearing in the fourth round are entitled to appear at the national level Piala Nusantara (Liga Nusantara) in 2014 as promotion play-off to the Premier Division next year.

Teams
This season there were 73 First Division club participants. A total of 66 clubs participating in amateur competitions ensure First Division. Certainty is obtained in 66 club forums Managers Meeting held in Jakarta and Surabaya, 12 to 13 April 2014.

The 66 clubs were divided into 12 groups based on consideration of the geographic aspects, and agreed to roll out its kick-off on 29 April.

PS Kwarta Deli Serdang (champion), Persinga Ngawi (runner-up), Bintang Jaya Asahan, Martapura FC, Persigubin Gunung Bintang, Villa 2000, PSGC Ciamis and Persida Sidoarjo promotion to the Premier Division this season after finishing in the top eight First Division last season.

PSPP Padang Panjang and Persipal Palu were relegated to the Liga Nusantara this season due to withdrawal before the First Division last season started.

Persenga Nganjuk and Persifa Fak-fak did not participate in the First Division this season because of the team they become participants Premier Division this season after last season also featured in the Premier Division LPIS.

PSGL Gayo Lues and PSAB Aceh Besar were relegated from the Premier Division due to withdrawal before the Premier Division last season started.

Persipas Paser participated in First Division after the disqualification of the Premier Division last season because of financial problems.

Perssin Sinjai, PSSB Bireuen and Persemalra Maluku Tenggara participated in First Division after not pass the verification participated Premier Division this season.

Cilegon United (champion), Jember United (runner-up), TGM Medan, Rumbai FC, Persilat Central Lampung, U.N.I Bandung, PS Badung, Persesa Sampang, Bontang Mitra United, PSN Nunukan, Persitoli Tolikara and Persiyali Yalimo promotion from Second Division after finishing in the top twelve last season.

First round
In this stage 73 teams divided into twelve group of six/seven, this round will begin on April 29 and ended on  8 June 2014.

Group A 
All matches played in Blangkejeren and Sigli, Aceh.

Group B 
All matches played in Siak Sri Indrapura, Riau.

Group C 
All matches played in Padang, West Sumatra and Kuantan Singingi Regency, Riau.

Group D 
All matches played in Bandar Lampung, Lampung and East Jakarta, Jakarta.

Group E 
All matches played in Bogor, West Java and Cilegon, Banten.

Group F 
All matches played in Batang Regency, Central Java and Kuningan Regency, West Java.

Group G 
All matches played in Banyumas Regency and Kendal Regency, Central Java.

Group H 
All matches played in Tuban Regency and Pasuruan Regency, East Java.

Group I 
All matches played in Lumajang Regency, East Java and Badung Regency, Bali.

Group J 
All matches played in Bontang and East Kutai Regency, East Kalimantan.

Group K 
All matches played in Ternate, North Maluku and Nabire, West Papua.

Group L 
All matches played in Papua.

Second round
In this stage 24 teams divided into six group of four. This round will begin on June 16 and ended on June 24, 2014.

Group M 
All matches played in Blangkejeren, Aceh.

Group N
All matches played in Cilegon, Banten.

Group O 
All matches played in Batang Regency, Central Java.

Group P 
All matches played in Tuban Regency, East Java.

Group Q 
All matches played in Badung Regency, Bali.

Group R 
All matches played in Jayapura, Papua.

Third round
In this stage 12 teams divided into three group of four. This round will begin on 30 August until 3 September 2014.

Group S

Group T

Group U

Fourth round
In this stage 6 teams divided into two group of three. This round began on 8 September 2014 and ended on 12 September 2014.

Group V

Group W

Final
The format for this round will be determined at the time of the manager meeting. The winner of each group in the fourth round will compete in the Final. Cilegon United became the champion.

References

Liga Indonesia First Division seasons
3